Live Twice may refer to:

 Live Twice (album), a 2004 album by Darius Danesh
 "Live Twice" (song), the title track from the album